Jordan Weal (born April 15, 1992) is a Canadian professional ice hockey player. He is currently playing under contract with HC Dynamo Moscow in the Kontinental Hockey League (KHL). Weal was originally selected by the Los Angeles Kings in the third round (70th overall) of the 2010 NHL Entry Draft.

Playing career
As a youth, Weal played in the 2004 and 2005 Quebec International Pee-Wee Hockey Tournaments with a minor ice hockey team from North Vancouver.

Weal played four years (2008–2012) of major junior hockey with the Regina Pats of the Western Hockey League (WHL), scoring 135 goals and 250 assists for 385 points while earning 186 penalty minutes in 282 games played. During that time, Weal was selected in the third round, 70th overall, by the Los Angeles Kings during the 2010 NHL Entry Draft. He was recognized for his outstanding play when he was named to the 2011–12 WHL (East) First All-Star Team.

On April 18, 2011, the Kings signed Weal to a three-year entry-level contract. While with the Kings' American Hockey League affiliate, the Manchester Monarchs, Weal won the Calder Cup in 2015, being chosen the playoffs' most valuable player with 10 goals and 12 assists.

On January 6, 2016, Weal was traded by the Kings at the mid-point of the 2015–16 season, along with a third-round pick, to the Philadelphia Flyers, in exchange for Vincent Lecavalier and Luke Schenn.

During the 2016–17 season, Weal scored his first NHL goal against the Colorado Avalanche on February 28, 2017.

In the 2018–19 season, his fourth within the Flyers organization, Weal registered three goals and nine points in 28 games. On January 11, 2019, he was traded to the Arizona Coyotes in exchange for Jacob Graves and a 2019 sixth-round pick. Weal was unable to show his offensive attributes with the Coyotes, contributing just one goal and one assist in 19 games.

On February 25, 2019, the Coyotes traded Weal to the Montreal Canadiens in exchange for Michael Chaput. He performed admirably to close out the season for the Canadiens, recording four goals and six assists in 16 games. On April 26, 2019, the Canadiens re-signed Weal to a two-year, $2.8 million contract.

In May 2021, after spending the entirety of the 2020–21 season with the Canadiens' top affiliate Laval Rocket, Weal elected to sign an optional two-year deal in Russia to join Ak Bars Kazan.

Following the 2021–22 season, having enjoyed a productive tenure with Ak Bars, Weal was traded to fellow KHL club, HC Dynamo Moscow, in exchange for former NHL forward Stanislav Galiev on July 1, 2022.

International play
In January 2022, Weal was selected to play for Team Canada at the 2022 Winter Olympics.

Career statistics

Regular season and playoffs

International

Awards and honours

References

External links

 

1992 births
Living people
Ak Bars Kazan players
Arizona Coyotes players
Canadian expatriate ice hockey players in the United States
Canadian ice hockey centres
HC Dynamo Moscow players
Ice hockey people from British Columbia
Laval Rocket players
Lehigh Valley Phantoms players
Los Angeles Kings draft picks
Los Angeles Kings players
Manchester Monarchs (AHL) players
Montreal Canadiens players
People from North Vancouver
Philadelphia Flyers players
Regina Pats players
Ice hockey players at the 2022 Winter Olympics
Olympic ice hockey players of Canada